Rubén Váldez may refer to:

 Rubén Váldez (sports shooter) (1923–2008), Peruvian sports shooter
 Ruben A. Valdez (1937-2019), American politician
 Rubén Óscar Valdez (born 1946), Spanish footballer striker